Ruslan Viktorovych Popov (born 9 August 1977) is a retired Ukrainian professional footballer who played as a defender.

Career
Ruslan Popov started his career in 1999 with Desna Chernihiv in Ukrainian Second League where he managed to play 11 matches and with the club he got 9 place in the league and he played 18 games and scored 1 goal in the season 1999–2000 In the season 2000–01 he played 9 matches and he got second place in the league. In the summer of 2001 he moved back to Spartak Sumy in Ukrainian Second League where he played 5 matches and he managed to win the Ukrainian Second League in 2001–02. In the summer of 2001 he moved to Nizhyn, where he won the Chernihiv Oblast Football Cup in 2002. In 2006 he moved to Avanhard Koryukivka.

Honours
Nizhyn
 Chernihiv Oblast Football Cup: 2002

Spartak Sumy
 Ukrainian Second League: 2001–02

References

External links 
 Ruslan Popov at footballfacts.ru

1977 births
Living people
Footballers from Chernihiv
FC Desna Chernihiv players
FC Spartak Sumy players
FC Avanhard Koriukivka players
Ukrainian footballers
Ukrainian Premier League players
Ukrainian First League players
Ukrainian Second League players
Association football defenders